Padres Butte is a butte near the tip of Padre Point on the south shore of Lake Powell in San Juan County, Utah, United States.

Description
It was formerly an island in the man-made lake, but land connecting the butte with the rest of Padre Point has been exposed as the lake's water levels have declined.

Padres Butte marks the site of the historical Crossing of the Fathers, a series of sand bars along the great bend in the Colorado River a mile west of the butte that once offered a fordable crossing of the river. This geographical feature's name was officially adopted in 1961 by the U.S. Board on Geographic Names.

According to the Köppen climate classification system, Gregory Butte is located in an arid climate zone with hot, very dry summers, and chilly winters with very little snow.

Gallery

See also

 Colorado Plateau

References

External links

 Weather forecast: Padres Butte

Buttes of Utah
Pre-statehood history of Utah
Old Spanish Trail (trade route)
Landforms of San Juan County, Utah
Glen Canyon National Recreation Area
Lake Powell
Colorado Plateau